Lovin' the Day is the debut album of the Dove Award-winning American urban gospel group Out of Eden, released in 1994. It features sisters Lisa, Andrea, and Danielle Kimmey. It was the launch album of Gotee Records, and was the catalyst for the creation of the record label; founders of the label Toby McKeehan, Todd Collins, and Joey Elwood had wanted to produce the album, but after not being able to find a Record label to sign the act to, they formed Gotee Records and began distributing the band's material on their own. The album peaked at #10 on the Top Contemporary Christian music chart. It includes a cover of the Bill Withers hit Lovely Day.

Track listing 
There are 14 songs on the album. It is 49 minutes and 54 seconds long.

Personnel

References

1994 debut albums
Out of Eden albums
Albums produced by TobyMac
Albums produced by Joey Elwood
Gotee Records albums